Apionion is a genus of beetles belonging to the family Brentidae.

The species of this genus are found in Central America.

Species:
 Apionion formoculus Poinar & Legalov, 2015 
 Apionion formosus Poinar & Legalov, 2015

References

Brentidae